The York Dukes were a minor league baseball team based in York, Nebraska. Between 1911 and 1931, York teams played exclusively as members of the Class D level Nebraska State League. The York Prohibitionists preceded the Dukes, playing in the Nebraska State League from 1911 to 1915. The Prohibitionists played home Nebraska State League games at Parks Park, and the Dukes hosted home games at Leavitt Stadium.

Baseball Hall of Fame member Dazzy Vance pitched for the 1912 York Prohibitionists.

History
The team was given the York Dukes moniker after a naming contest held by the local paper, the York Daily News. Previously, the York Prohibitionists had played in the Nebraska State League from 1911 to 1915.

York had been awarded the Red Cloud, Nebraska franchise in 1911, after Red Cloud had one year of Nebraska State League play. The York team started without any players from the Red Cloud franchise and without a nickname. York was then a dry town and did not allow Sunday baseball to be played. After the team played their first away game against the Fremont Pathfinders from Fremont, Nebraska, a Fremont sportswriter gave them the nickname York Prohibitionists and the name stuck.

In 1912, with Dazzy Vance on the roster, the Prohibistions drew 1,700 fans to Parks Park on opening day.

At the beginning of the 1915 season, the Kearney Buffaloes and Columbus Pawnees franchises both folded, leaving the league reduced to six teams. Then at the end of June, 1915, the Grand Island Champions withdrew from the league and the Nebraska State League disbanded on June 29, 1915, with York in 3rd place.

In 1928, when the franchise returned to the reformed Nebraska State League, the York Dukes, played at Leavitt Stadium and drew 9,434 fans for the season. They had an average daily attendance of 205 fans on weekdays and 637 fans on Sundays, with the Sunday baseball ban having been lifted. The name "Dukes" was selected in a naming contest by the local newspaper and Mr. Ezra McCormick of 128 Blackburn won the prize of two free tickets to the opening game for submitting the Dukes name. Other entries included Beavers, Panthers, Tommies, Plezalls and HillToppers.

After the 1931 season, the York franchise relocated to become the Beatrice Blues in Beatrice, Nebraska.

York has not hosted another minor league team.

The ballparks
The York Dukes' home field was noted to be Leavitt Stadium, located within East Hill Park. The Prohibitionists had reportedly played home games at Parks Park, which was located near downtown York.

Leavitt Stadium is still in use. Today, the park the is home to the York College Panthers baseball team. Levitt Stadium hosted the 2001 American Legion Nebraska State Baseball Tournament and is also home for local Legion Teams. The ballpark is located at 921 East 6th street, between East 6th and East 8th Street in York, Nebraska.

Timeline

Year–by–year records

Notable alumni

Baseball Hall of Fame alumni
 Dazzy Vance (1912) Inducted, 1955

Notable alumni
 Lefty Davis (Player/MGR, 1911–1912)
 Buzz Murphy (1914)
 Jack Richardson (1913)
 Bennie Warren (1931)
 Dutch Wetzel (1915)

See also
York Dukes playersYork Prohibitionists players

References

External links
Baseball Reference
Parks Park photos

Defunct minor league baseball teams
1928 establishments in Kansas
1931 disestablishments in the United States
Sports clubs disestablished in 1931
Professional baseball teams in Kansas
York County, Nebraska
Defunct baseball teams in Nebraska
Baseball teams established in 1928
Baseball teams disestablished in 1931
Nebraska State League teams